The Kandiyohi County Historical Society (KCHS) is a local history museum in Willmar, Minnesota, United States. Formerly known as the Old Settlers Association, it was founded in 1897 to "discover, preserve and share the story of Kandiyohi County and its people." The archives and Lawson research library are the principal sources used by KCHS staff, volunteers, and visitors to carry out this mission today and into the future. On average, the museum has 9,000 visitors annually.

Features 
KCHS consists of six buildings: a main museum and research library; the Sperry House, a restored turn-of-the-century Victorian home; a one-room schoolhouse; an agricultural barn; a restored log cabin which was a site of the 1862 US-Dakota conflict; and Great Northern Passenger Engine #2523.

Regular exhibits include several displays marking the involvement of Kandiyohi County residents in conflicts such as the Civil War, the Spanish-American War, World War I and II, and the 1862 US-Dakota conflict. Additionally, the museum features a monthly rotating display of notable items from its collections. Exhibits focus principally on the effects of wider historical events on local residents.

Great Northern class P-2 Mountain (4-8-2) #2523 

This locomotive, built in 1923, was commissioned to keep up with increased demand for passenger trains along the Great Northern railroad. It had a top speed of 50 mph and could haul up to 12 heavyweight passenger cars at a time. This series was retired in 1955, and this engine in particular was placed on permanent display at KCHS in 1965. Only one other locomotive of its type remains, in Port of Pasco, Washington.

Gallery

References

External links
Kandiyohi County Historical Society

History museums in Minnesota
Historical societies in Minnesota
Kandiyohi County, Minnesota